"Hold You Tight" is a song performed by American contemporary R&B singer Tara Kemp, issued as the lead single from her eponymous debut album. The song contains samples of "Think (About It)" by Lyn Collins and "Kissing My Love" by Bill Withers.

"Hold You Tight" was Kemp's biggest hit on the US Billboard Hot 100, peaking at number three in April 1991. It also peaked at number one on the Billboard Hot Dance Music/Maxi-Singles Sales chart and reached the top 30 in Canada and New Zealand. The single was certified gold by the Recording Industry Association of America on June 7, 1991.

Charts

Weekly charts

Year-end charts

Certifications

Release history

References

External links
 
 

1990 songs
1991 debut singles
Giant Records (Warner) singles
Tara Kemp songs